Sir Thomas Paston (by 1517 – 4 September 1550), of London, was an English politician.

He was a son of Bridget Heydon, a daughter of Sir Henry Heydon of Baconsthorpe, and Sir William Paston (c.1479 – 1554), a son of Sir John Paston and his first wife, Margery Brewes.

He was a Member of Parliament (MP) for Norfolk in 1545.

By 1544, he married Agnes, daughter of Sir John Leigh of Stockwell, Surrey. They raised two sons and one daughter.

References

1550 deaths
Politicians from London
English knights
English MPs 1545–1547
Year of birth uncertain
Members of the Parliament of England for Norfolk